Stavtrup is a western suburb of Aarhus in Denmark. It is located 7 km from the city centre and has a population of 3,729 (1 January 2010). Since 1 January 2011, Stavtrup is officially a part of Aarhus' urban area under the postal district of Viby J.

Stavtrup is largely a residential area and there is easy access to the nature around Brabrand Lake.

References

External links 

Neighborhoods of Aarhus